Hubert Norman Maxwell Parke (21 April 1886 – 24 April 1967) was an Australian rules footballer who played for the Carlton Football Club and Melbourne Football Club in the Victorian Football League (VFL).

Notes

External links 

Bert Parke's profile at Blueseum

1886 births
1967 deaths
Australian rules footballers from Victoria (Australia)
Carlton Football Club players
Melbourne Football Club players